The Blow Up Your Video World Tour was a concert tour played by the hard rock band AC/DC, which had 5 legs spreading over the course of 10 months starting on 1 February 1988 in Perth, Australia, finishing on 13 November 1988 in Inglewood, California.

Background
This tour would be the last to feature drummer Simon Wright, before being replaced by Chris Slade in 1989. The tour also saw Malcolm Young step out from the North American legs due to an alcohol problem. During this period, he was replaced by his nephew (and subsequent permanent replacement in 2014), Stevie Young. This was AC/DC's last tour and studio album during the 1980s, and it put them back in the limelight after a small streak of commercially disappointing albums.

Every show on the North American leg of the tour began with a heatseeking missile pod rising up into the stage; as the band would open with the song "Heatseeker", off the Blow Up Your Video album.

Reception
Aaron Roberts from the Observer Reporter gave the performance in Pittsburgh a positive review. He opened his review, stating that the energetic band treated the screaming teenage audience to non-stop rock and roll which he claimed was rare in the age of high-tech shows, as Brian Johnson got the audience involved in nearly every song, even the old favorites. He noted that there were mixing problems present earlier at the show, but had gone unnoticed by the audience. He concluded his review, stating that if someone was interested in hear well-performed rock and roll, they need to go and see AC/DC.

Setlist
"Heatseeker"
"Shoot to Thrill"
"Dirty Deeds Done Dirt Cheap"
"Back in Black"
"Who Made Who"
"Jailbreak"
"Hells Bells"
"Nick of Time"
"The Jack"
"That's the Way I Wanna Rock 'n' Roll"
"You Shook Me All Night Long"
"Rock and Roll Ain't Noise Pollution" 
"High Voltage"
"Whole Lotta Rosie"
"Let There Be Rock"

Encore
"Highway to Hell"
"T.N.T."
"For Those About to Rock (We Salute You)"

Tour dates

Personnel
Angus Young – lead guitar
Cliff Williams – bass guitar, backing vocals
Malcolm Young – rhythm guitar, backing vocals (legs 1–2)
Simon Wright – drums
Brian Johnson – lead vocals

Additional musicians
Stevie Young – rhythm guitar, backing vocals (leg 3)

Notes

References

Citations

Sources
 
 
 

AC/DC concert tours
1988 concert tours